Catephia barrettae is a species of moth of the family Erebidae. It is found in South Africa, where it has been recorded from the Eastern Cape.

References

Endemic moths of South Africa
Catephia
Moths described in 1905
Moths of Africa